Strathkelvin and Bearsden is a constituency of the Scottish Parliament (Holyrood). It elects one Member of the Scottish Parliament (MSP) by the first past the post method of election. Also, however, it is one of ten constituencies in the West Scotland electoral region, which elects seven additional members, in addition to ten constituency MSPs, to produce a form of proportional representation for the region as a whole.

The seat has been held by Rona Mackay of the Scottish National Party since the 2016 Scottish Parliament election.

Electoral region 

The other nine constituencies of the West Scotland region are Clydebank and Milngavie, Cunninghame North, Cunninghame South, Dumbarton, Eastwood, Greenock and Inverclyde, Paisley, Renfrewshire North and West and Renfrewshire South.

The region covers part of the Argyll and Bute council area, the East Dunbartonshire council area, the East Renfrewshire council area, the Inverclyde council area, North Ayrshire council area, the Renfrewshire council area and the West Dunbartonshire council area.

Constituency boundaries and council area 

The Strathkelvin and Bearsden constituency was created at the same time as the Scottish Parliament, in 1999, with the name and boundaries of an existing Westminster constituency. In 2005, however, the Westminster (House of Commons) constituency was abolished in favour of new constituencies.

The rest of East Dunbartonshire is represented by the Clydebank and Milngavie constituency.

For the 2011 Scottish Parliament election the boundaries of the seat were altered to include the following electoral wards:

Bearsden South
Bishopbriggs North and Campsie
Bishopbriggs South
Kirkintilloch East and North and Twechar
Lenzie and Kirkintilloch South

Member of the Scottish Parliament

Election results

2020s

2010s

2000s

1990s

Notes and references

External links

Constituencies of the Scottish Parliament
1999 establishments in Scotland
Constituencies established in 1999
Scottish Parliament constituencies and regions 1999–2011
Scottish Parliament constituencies and regions from 2011
Politics of East Dunbartonshire
Bearsden
Kirkintilloch
Lenzie
Bishopbriggs